Jacob Larsen (born 13 June 1988 in Søllerød) is a Danish rower. He has won three gold medals at European and World championships as part of the Gold Four.

References

External links
 

1988 births
Living people
Danish male rowers
World Rowing Championships medalists for Denmark
Olympic silver medalists for Denmark
European Rowing Championships medalists
People from Rudersdal Municipality
Sportspeople from the Capital Region of Denmark